Agra Taj Colony is a neighbourhood locality in Lyari Town, located in the Karachi South district of Karachi, Pakistan.

References

External links 
 Karachi Website.

Neighbourhoods of Karachi
Lyari Town